Manilius is a lunar impact crater on the northeast edge of Mare Vaporum. Its diameter is 38 km.

Description
Manilius has a well-defined rim with a sloping inner surface that runs directly down to the ring-shaped mound of scree along the base, and a small outer rampart. The small crater interior has a higher albedo than the surroundings, and it appears bright when the sun is overhead. Within the crater is a central peak formation near the midpoint.

The crater also possesses a ray system that extends for a distance of over 300 kilometers.  Despite the presence of these rays, which generally indicate the age of the crater as Copernican, the crater is currently mapped as Eratosthenian age.

Names
Manilius is named after the Roman astronomer Marcus Manilius. Like many of the craters on the Moon's near side, it was given its name by Giovanni Riccioli, whose 1651 nomenclature system has become standardized. Earlier lunar cartographers had given the feature different names. Michael van Langren's 1645 map calls it "Isabellae Reg. Hisp." (Isabella, Queen of Spain), and Johannes Hevelius called it "Insula Besbicus" after the island in Turkey now known as İmralı.

Satellite craters

By convention these features are identified on lunar maps by placing the letter on the side of the crater midpoint that is closest to Manilius.

The following craters have been renamed by the IAU.
 Manilius A — See Bowen.
 Manilius F — See Yangel'.

References

External links

Manilius at The Moon Wiki
 
 

Impact craters on the Moon
Eratosthenian